Thingbaijam Babu Singh was an Indian classical dancer, academic and choreographer of the Indian classical dance form of Manipuri. He was the Pradhan Guru (chief instructor) of Pung and Raas traditions of Manipuri dance at the Jawaharlal Nehru Manipur Dance Academy of the Sangeet Natak Akademi. Born on 8 February 1936 at Lairensajik, a small village in the state of Manipur, he was known to have been one of the notable choreographers and teachers of Manipuri dance and had a long line of renowned performers such as Elam Endira Devi, Ibemubi Devi, and Priti Patel, as his students. Singh was the author of a book, Meitei Punglon Raga Ahouba, and was a recipient of the Sangeet Natak Akademi Award for the year 1990. The Government of India awarded him the fourth highest civilian honour of the Padma Shri, in 2007, for his contributions to Manipuri dance.

See also 
 Manipuri dance
 Elam Endira Devi

References 

Recipients of the Padma Shri in arts
Recipients of the Sangeet Natak Akademi Award
1936 births
Indian classical choreographers
Indian male dancers
Manipuri classical Indian dance exponents
Dancers from Manipur
Year of death missing
Performers of Indian classical dance
Indian choreographers
20th-century Indian dancers